The 22nd Asian Baseball Championship was contested in Sapporo Dome, Sapporo, Japan in November 2003. The tournament is sanctioned by the Asian Baseball Federation. The top two teams of the tournament gained automatic entry into the 2004 Olympic Games in Athens.

Teams Qualified

Squads

Chinese Taipei (Taiwan)

B Level

A Level

Final ranking

Baseball
Asian Baseball Championship
2003
A
A
Baseball at the 2004 Summer Olympics
Asian Baseball Championship